Henry Bocage (1835 – 14 October 1917) was a French playwright of the second half of the 19th century. A nephew of the actor Bocage and younger brother of Paul Bocage, Hanry Bocage wrote comedies as well as novels.

An engineer by profession, he authored, alone or in collaboration, several successful plays on the Parisians stages of his time.
Among them are:
comedies 
1869: l’Architecte de ces dames
1871: la Canne de Damoclès
1874: Une fille d’Ève, with Raymond Deslandes
1880: les Trois Bougies
1884: En partie fine
1890: la Vie à deux
opéras comiques 
1880: la Girouette, with Étienne Hémery, music by À. Coedès,
1881: les Poupées de l’infante, music by Grisar.

19th-century French dramatists and playwrights
19th-century French novelists
French librettists
1835 births
1917 deaths